Un Nuevo Despertar (A New Awakening) is a studio album by Lalo Rodríguez released in 1988. Continuing the tradition of the salsa romántica, Rodríguez also added in sexual songs known as salsa erótica which was short-lived.

Singles
The album produced three singles that charted on the Billboard Hot Latin Tracks.
"Ven, devórame otra vez" ("Come, Devour Me Again") was the first single released from the album. The song displays an example of the salsa erotica-style songs. The song charted #10 on the Hot Latin Tracks.
"Sí, te mentí" ("Yes, I Lied to You") was the second single released from the album and charted #12 on the Hot Latin Tracks.
"Voy a escarbar tu cuerpo" ("I Will Dig Through Your Body") was the third single released from the album and charted #23 on the Hot Latin Tracks.

Track listing

Chart position

Awards
Un nuevo despertar was given the first Premio Lo Nuestro award for "Tropical Album of the Year" in 1989.

Reception

José A. Estévez Jr. of Allmusic gave the album a mixed his efforts on the album a "lackluster production" despite its commercial success.

See also
List of number-one Billboard Tropical Albums from the 1980s

References

1988 albums
Lalo Rodríguez albums